Port Sudan International Stadium is a multi-use stadium in Port Sudan, Sudan.  It is currently used mostly for football matches and is the home stadium of Hay al-Arab Port Sudan and Hilal Port Sudan.  The stadium has a capacity of 20,000 people. The stadium also hosted the 2011 African Nations of Championship 2011 which was held in Sudan.

Port